Balambika (Deity) (also known as "Bala") is a goddess of the Hindu religion, usually found in South India. Her name means "Goddess Of Knowledge", or "Child Goddess".

Balambika's description appears in her sacred text the Balambika Dasakam. She is also pictured as having four arms and a red circle on each palm. She holds a sacred textbook and a japamala with two of her arms. Balambika is considered a child, and acts as one, but is said to bring true knowledge, education, wisdom, power and prosperity for a better life. She is sometimes called the goddess of children, and therefore, her temple was constructed to be devoted to children.

Moolamantram
“Aiym Kleem Sow. Sow, Kleem, Aiym. Aiym, Kleem, Sow."

"Aiym" stands for learning.

"Kleem" stands for magnetic attraction.

"Sow" stands for prosperity.

This simple three word moolamantram is considered to be the solution to all modern worldly problems. When you chant this moolamantram, Balambika is said to instantly be around you. When you recite her name, "Bala," she will be listening to what you say at all times.

Temple
Balambika has a temple in Kamarasavalli in  Ariyalur district of Tamil Nadu. It is around 1000–2000 years old. There are sculptures on the walls that show the story of Karkodga performing Shiva Puja (Worship of God Shiva) with Lord Vinayaka and Nandi. It is said that people of the Cancer zodiac sign should pray here for relief.

Festivals celebrated:

Sacred text
Her sacred text that describes her is called the Balambika Dasakam. This text uses the phrase "Who is" or "Whose is" to describe Balambika or what she has. Every line also begins with "Please shower a merciful glance at me, Oh Balambika." Originally written in Sanskrit, it was translated below by P.R.Ramachander:

References

External links
 Sribalathirupurasundari.com
 Hindupedia.com
 Temple.dinamalar.com
 Secure.flickr.com
 Balambikathirupanitrust.webs.com

Hindu goddesses